Thamarakudy is a village located in Kottarakkara taluk in Kollam District, Kerala state, India. It is located 34 km towards East from District headquarters Kollam, 6 km from Vettikkavala and 75 km from State capital Thiruvananthapuram. Thamarakudy is a part of Mylom Grama Panchayath. This place was hit in the news in 2013 by a Co-operative bank fraud.

Nearby villages 

 Enathu - 10 kilometres (via, Kalayapuram, MC Rd)
 Pattazhi - 6 kilometres
 Kulakkada - 8 kilometres (Via Kalayapuram)
 Melila - 10 kilometres (Via Mylom Kura, Thalavoor Rd)
 Kunnicode - 9 kilometres (Via Pandithitta, Thalavoor)

Transport 

 Bus Transport: Nearest town Kottarakkara is well connected to all parts of kerala. There are regular KSRTC bus services from Kottarakkara to Pattazhi via Mylom, Thamarakudy every 15 minutes.
 Railway stations: Nearest railway stations are Kura (5 kilometres) which connects Kollam Junction (34 kilometres), the nearest major rail head, and Chengannur (41 kilometres).
 Airports: Nearest airport is at Thiruvananthapuram (90 kilometres). Cochin International Airport is 175 kilometres away.

See also
Pattazhi
Pathanapuram
Kollam

References

External links
 Wikimapia

Villages in Kollam district